Sylvie Readman (born 1958 in Quebec City, Quebec) is a Canadian photographer.

Her work is included in the collections of the National Gallery of Canada and the Musée national des beaux-arts du Québec.

References

1958 births
Living people
21st-century Canadian women artists
21st-century Canadian photographers
20th-century Canadian women artists
20th-century Canadian photographers
Artists from Quebec City